Ferdinand Bol (24 June 1616 – 24 August 1680) was a Dutch painter, etcher and draftsman. Although his surviving work is rare, it displays Rembrandt's influence; like his master, Bol favored historical subjects, portraits, numerous self-portraits, and single figures in exotic finery.

Biography
Ferdinand was born in Dordrecht as the son of a surgeon, Balthasar Bol. Ferdinand Bol was first an apprentice of Jacob Cuyp in his hometown and/or of Abraham Bloemaert in Utrecht. After 1630, he studied with Rembrandt, living in his house in Sint Antoniesbreestraat, then a fashionable street and area for painters, jewellers, architects, and many Flemish and Jewish immigrants. In 1641, Bol started his own studio.

In 1652, he became a burgher of Amsterdam, and in 1653, he married Elisabeth Dell, whose father held positions with the Admiralty of Amsterdam and the wine merchants' guild, both institutions that later gave commissions to the artist. Within a few years (1655), he became the head of the guild and received orders to deliver two chimney pieces for rooms in the new town hall designed by Jacob van Campen, and four more for the Admiralty of Amsterdam.

Around this time, Bol was a popular and successful painter. His palette had lightened, his figures possessed greater elegance, and by the middle of the decade he was receiving more official commissions than any other artist in Amsterdam. Godfrey Kneller was his pupil. Bol delivered four paintings for the two mansions of the brothers Trip, originally also from Dordrecht.

Bol's first wife died in 1660. In 1669, Bol married for the second time to Anna van Erckel, widow of the treasurer of the Admiralty, and apparently retired from painting at that point in his life. In 1672, the couple moved to Keizersgracht 672, then a newly designed part of the city, and now the Museum Van Loon. Bol served as a governor in a Home for Lepers. Bol died a few weeks after his wife, on Herengracht, where his son, a lawyer, lived.

Probably his best known painting is a portrait of Elisabeth Bas, the wife of the naval officer Joachim Swartenhondt and an innkeeper near the Dam square. This and many other of his paintings would in the 19th century be falsely attributed to Rembrandt.

Gallery (selected works)

Notes

External links

 Ferdinand Bol page at the Rijksmuseum's web site with the famous portrait of Elisabeth Bas.
 Works and literature at PubHist
 Portrait of a gentlemen
 Two paintings by Bol for the townhall, click "verder" to see the second one
 Ferdinand Bol. Paintings

1616 births
1680 deaths
Dutch Golden Age printmakers
Dutch etchers
Dutch Golden Age painters
Dutch male painters
Artists from Dordrecht
Pupils of Rembrandt